Ross Steele AM is an Australian author, academic and Francophile. He has published thirty-seven books in French and English on the subjects including French culture, language and the teaching of French language. He has received a number of awards including Member of the Order of Australia (awarded 2006), Chevalier de la Légion d'honneur (awarded 1996) and Officier in the Ordre National de la Légion d’Honneur in 2008.

References

External links

Ross Steele named Honorary Fellow, at University of Sydney, 21 April 2022
2008 Alumni Awards Recipients – The University of Sydney
Newspaper articles about Ross Steele, trove.nla.gov.au.

Members of the Order of Australia
Australian non-fiction writers
Australian gay men
Year of birth missing (living people)
Living people
Chevaliers of the Légion d'honneur
Officiers of the Légion d'honneur
Academic staff of the University of Sydney
Academic staff of the University of New South Wales
University of Sydney alumni